Bulinus tropicus is a species of a tropical freshwater snail with a sinistral shell, an aquatic gastropod mollusk in the family Bulinidae, the ramshorn snails and their allies.

Distribution 
Distribution of Bulinus tropicus includes:
 Namibia
 ...

References

External links 
 
 

Bulinus
Gastropods described in 1848
Taxa named by Christian Ferdinand Friedrich Krauss